Jon-Paul "J. P." Anderson (born April 27, 1992) is a Canadian former professional ice hockey goaltender. He most recently played for the Toledo Walleye of the ECHL.

Anderson played in the Ontario Hockey League (OHL) and was a standout with the Mississauga St. Michael's Majors and Sarnia Sting. Approaching his third season with the Majors in  2010–11, Anderson was signed as an undrafted free agent by the San Jose Sharks after a strong performance in the 2010 Young Stars Tournament on September 21, 2010.

Anderson holds the OHL record for the most wins by a goaltender (126).

Career statistics

Regular season and playoffs

International

Awards and honours

References

External links

1992 births
Adirondack Thunder players
Albany Devils players
Allen Americans players
Canadian ice hockey goaltenders
Mississauga St. Michael's Majors players
Living people
Ontario Reign (ECHL) players
San Francisco Bulls players
Sarnia Sting players
Ice hockey people from Toronto
Toledo Walleye players
Worcester Sharks players
Wheeling Nailers players